Vendotaenids are Ediacaran macro-fossils. Their presence is useful in determining the evolution of Precambrian life, however, Vendotaenids are not common and there is little data on them.

Morphology
The organism reaches around 15 cm in length and are around a millimeter in width. They are often found as red or black ribbons within the bedding plane. The remains are often curved, unbranched and have been found twisted or untwisted. Vendotaenia tends to be untwisted whereas Tyrasotaenia tends to be twisted. Observations have found that the Krolotaenia genus lateral branching is common, but in it is very uncommon for a branch to branch into two parallel ribbons. Tyrostaenia and Krolotaenia are different in that Tyrostaenia has unbranched and crumpled ribbons whereas Krolotaenia lacks these features.

Classification
Originally interpreted as brown algae, the fossils are now thought to represent sulfide-reducing bacteria. There are potentially other taxa within Vendophyceae, listed in Tewari, 1999 as " synonyms". These synonyms are listed as: "Vendotaenia, Aataenia, Katnia, Laminarites, Proterotainia, Sinotaenia, Tyrasotaenia, Vidhyania, and Krolotaenia."  The classification of these organisms is incomplete as there is not enough information to build a Phylogenetic tree of Vendotaenids.

Occurrence
The carbonaceous fossils, which can be extracted by HF dissolution, are found in precambrian to Early Cambrian rocks, dating from approx. .

See also
 List of Ediacaran genera

References

Fossils
Ediacaran life